Freyanidae is a family of feather mites in the  order Astigmata. There are more than 15 genera in Freyanidae.

Genera
These genera belong to the family Freyanidae:

 Allofreyana Gaud and Atyeo, 1975
 Burhinacarus, Dubinin, 1956
 Cauralicola Gaud & Atyeo, 1981
 Cernyella, Gaud, 1968
 Diomedacarinae Gaud & Atyeo, 1981
 Diomedacarus, Dubinin, 1949
 Dobyella Gaud et Atyeo, 1975
 Freyana Haller, 1877
 Freyanomorpha, Gaud, 1957
 Freyanopsis Dubinin, 1950

 Michaelia Trouessart, 1884
 Morinyssus Gaud & Atyeo, 1982
 Parafreyana Cerny, 1969
 Pavlovskiana Dubinin, 1950
 Pelecymerus Gaud and Atyeo, 1975
 Sulanyssus Dubinin, 1953

References

Further reading

 
 
 

Sarcoptiformes
Acari families